Help! Help! Police! is a lost 1919 silent American comedy film directed by Edward Dillon.

Plot
As described in the film magazine Moving Picture World, George Welston (Walsh), the son of a wealthy rubber manufacturer, is staying in Palm Beach as is another rubber man, Judson Pendleton (Hallam), and his daughter Eve (Mann). The two fathers are concerned about a $100,000 rubber shipment, and are competing for it. George has been arrest twice for speeding. One night he sees a man going by the window into Eve's room, so he climbs the roof and enters. The thief sees him coming and locks himself in a closet. The house detective sees George enter and nabs him, and while they are arguing the thief escapes. Eve and her father enter her room, and her father makes the detective let George go, although he still suspects him. The thief enters another room, gags a girl who was sleeping there, and takes her jewels. A cigarette starts the room on fire. George sees the smoke and rescues the girl. While taking the unconscious girl to the hospital, he is stopped by a policeman. The girl accuses George of the robbery. A trial is set, and George's father puts up $100,000 as bail. This would keep him from getting the rubber shipment unless the thief is caught. Pendleton has also lost his $100,000 in the robbery. George gets on the trail of two thieves, and after a fight chases them in an automobile. He manages to imprison them in a van without their suspecting anything is wrong. He delivers the two thieves to court just as the hour for the start of the trial is reached. Both $100,000 are recovered, and Pendleton decides that George would make a good son-in-law.

Cast 
 George Walsh as George Welston
 Eric Mayne as Edward P. Welston
 Henry Hallam as Judson Pendleton
 Marie Burke as Mrs. Pendleton
 Alice Mann as Eve Pendleton
 Alan Edwards as Arthur Trask
 Evelyn Brent as Marian Trevor
 Joseph Burke as The Judge

References

External links 

1919 films
1919 comedy films
Silent American comedy films
American silent feature films
American black-and-white films
Films directed by Edward Dillon
Fox Film films
Lost American films
1919 lost films
Lost comedy films
1910s American films
1910s English-language films